December 28 - Eastern Orthodox liturgical calendar - December 30

All fixed commemorations below are observed on January 11 by Orthodox Churches on the Old Calendar.

For December 29th, Orthodox Churches on the Old Calendar commemorate the Saints listed on December 16.

Feasts
 Afterfeast of the Nativity of Christ.

Saints
 The 14,000 Infants (Holy Innocents) slain by Herod at Bethlehem, the first Christian martyrs.
 Venerable Athenodorus, disciple of St. Pachomius the Great (4th century)
 Venerable Benjamin, monk, of Nitria in Egypt (392)
 Venerable Marcellus, Abbot of the Monastery of the Unsleeping Ones ("the Ever-Vigilant"), Constantinople (485)
 Venerable Thaddeus, Confessor, of the Studion Monastery (818) 
 Venerable Saint George, Archbishop of Nicomedia, composer of Canons and Troparia (c .857 - 891)

Pre-Schism Western saints
 Saint Trophimus, first Bishop of Arles in France (c. 280)
 Martyrs Callistus, Felix and Boniface, martyrs in Rome.
 Martyrs Dominic, Victor, Primian, Lybosus, Saturninus, Crescentius, Secundus and Honoratus, martyrs in North Africa.
 Saint Albert of Gambron, a courtier who became a hermit, later founding the small monastery of Gambron-sur-l'Authion in France (7th century)
 Saint Ebrulfus (Evroult), Abbot, born in Bayeux, became a monk at the monastery of Deux-Jumeaux, later founding a monastery at Pays d'Ouche in Normany, and other smaller monasteries (596)
 Saint Girald (Girard, Giraud), a monk at Lagny in France, later Abbot of Saint-Arnoul; he became Abbot of Fontenelle Abbey, where he was murdered (1031)

Post-Schism Orthodox saints
 Saint Mark the Grave-digger, of the Kiev Caves (11th century)
 Saints Theophilus and John, of the Kiev Caves (11th-12th century)
 Saint Theophilus, Abbot, of Luga and Omutch (Pskov) (1412), disciple of St. Arsenius of Konevits. 
 Saint Basiliscus, Elder, the Hesychast of Siberia (Turinsk) (1824)
 Venerable Laurence of Chernigov (1950)

New martyrs and confessors
 New Hieromartyr Arcadius, Bishop of Tver (1937)
 New Hieromartyr Theodosius Belenky, Priest, at Chimkent (1938)
 Virgin-martyrs: Natalia, Natalia, Eudokia, Anna, Matrona, Barbara, Anna, Eudokia, Ephrosia, Agrippina and Natalia (1942)

Other commemorations
 Commemoration of the consecration of the church of the Holy Forty Martyrs, near the Copper Tetrapyle (four-way arch). 
 Commemoration of all Orthodox Christians who have died from hunger, thirst, the sword, and freezing.

Icon gallery

Notes

References

Sources
 December 29/January 11. Orthodox Calendar (PRAVOSLAVIE.RU).
 January 11 / December 29. HOLY TRINITY RUSSIAN ORTHODOX CHURCH (A parish of the Patriarchate of Moscow).
 December 29. OCA - The Lives of the Saints.
 The Autonomous Orthodox Metropolia of Western Europe and the Americas (ROCOR). St. Hilarion Calendar of Saints for the year of our Lord 2004. St. Hilarion Press (Austin, TX). p. 3.
 December 29. Latin Saints of the Orthodox Patriarchate of Rome.
 The Roman Martyrology. Transl. by the Archbishop of Baltimore. Last Edition, According to the Copy Printed at Rome in 1914. Revised Edition, with the Imprimatur of His Eminence Cardinal Gibbons. Baltimore: John Murphy Company, 1916. pp. 400–401.
Greek Sources
 Great Synaxaristes:  29 ΔΕΚΕΜΒΡΙΟΥ. ΜΕΓΑΣ ΣΥΝΑΞΑΡΙΣΤΗΣ.
  Συναξαριστής. 29 Δεκεμβρίου. ECCLESIA.GR. (H ΕΚΚΛΗΣΙΑ ΤΗΣ ΕΛΛΑΔΟΣ). 
Russian Sources
  11 января (29 декабря). Православная Энциклопедия под редакцией Патриарха Московского и всея Руси Кирилла (электронная версия). (Orthodox Encyclopedia - Pravenc.ru).
  29 декабря (ст.ст.) 11 января 2013 (нов. ст.). Русская Православная Церковь Отдел внешних церковных связей. (DECR).

December in the Eastern Orthodox calendar